Vehicle registration plates of the United Kingdom, Crown dependencies and overseas territories include:

 Vehicle registration plates of the United Kingdom
Vehicle registration plates of Northern Ireland
 Vehicle registration plates of the Isle of Man
 Vehicle registration plates of Jersey
Vehicle registration plates of the Bailiwick of Guernsey
 Vehicle registration plates of Gibraltar
 Vehicle registration plates of the British Overseas Territories